Chaca chaca is a species of angler catfish found in the Ganges-Brahmaputra River system of India and the Ayeyarwady River of Myanmar, where it is found in rivers, canals and ponds of grassland, scrubland, deciduous forest and rainforest habitats. These species grow to a length of 26.0 cm (10.2 inches). This fish is found in the aquarium trade. In Assam, it is locally known as kurkuri.

It is now listed as an endangered species.

References 

Chacidae
Fish of Bangladesh
Fish described in 1822